The 2023 Mid-American Conference football season will be the 78th season for the Mid-American Conference (MAC), as part of the 2023 NCAA Division I FBS football season. Non-conference play will begin with one game on August 26.  Conference play will begin on September 23 and will conclude with the conference championship game on Saturday, December 2 at Ford Field in Detroit, Michigan.

Previous season

During the 2022 conference season, Ohio won the East Division with a record of 7–1 and Toledo won the West Division with a 5–3 conference record. In the 2022 MAC Championship Game, Toledo defeated Ohio by a final score of 17–7. The MAC finished with a 4–2 bowl record which was good enough to win the Bowl Challenge Cup

Coaches

Coaching changes
The MAC enters the 2023 season with two new head football coaches:

 Western Michigan fired Tim Lester on November 28, 2022, after his team finished the 2022 season with a 5–7. On December 7, 2022 Lance Taylor, who was the offensive coordinator for Louisville in 2022, was introduced as the new head coach.
 On December 4, 2022 Sean Lewis stepped down as Kent State head coach to become the offensive coordinator at Colorado under new head coach Deion Sanders. On December 13, 2022, Kent State hired former Minnesota associate head coach Kenni Burns as their new head coach.

Head coaching records

Rankings

Schedule

All times Eastern time.

Week 0

Week 1

Week 2

Week 3

Week 4

Week 5

Week 6

Week 7

Week 8

Week 9

Week 10

Week 11

Week 12

Week 13

MAC Conference Championship Game

Postseason

Bowl Games

MAC records vs. other conferences
2022–2023 records against non-conference foes:

Regular Season

Postseason

Mid-American vs Power 5 matchups
This is a list of games the MAC has scheduled versus power conference teams (ACC, Big Ten, Big 12, Pac-12, Notre Dame and SEC). All rankings are from the current AP Poll at the time of the game.

Mid-American vs Group of Five matchups
The following games include MAC teams competing against teams from the American, C-USA, Mountain West or Sun Belt.

Mid-American vs FBS independents matchups
The following games include MAC  teams competing against FBS Independents, which includes Army, UConn, or UMass.

Mid-American vs. FCS matchups
The following games include MAC teams competing against FCS schools.

Head to head matchups

Awards and honors

Player of the week honors

East Division

West Division

References

2023 Mid-American Conference football season